The Delhi Legislative Assembly election was held on 7 February 2015 to elect 70 members of the Sixth Legislative Assembly of Delhi. The results were announced on 10 February 2015. The Aam Aadmi Party secured an absolute majority in the assembly, winning 67 of the 70 seats.

Background
In the 2013 Delhi state elections, the Bharatiya Janata Party (along with its pre-poll ally Shiromani Akali Dal) emerged as the single-largest party, winning 32 out of the 70 seats. However, they fell short of an outright majority and therefore were unable to form the government. This led the then Lieutenant Governor of Delhi Najeeb Jung to invite the Aam Aadmi Party, the second-largest party after the BJP, to form the government. On 28 December 2013, AAP formed the state government after taking outside support from the Indian National Congress. AAP's leader Arvind Kejriwal, who defeated the incumbent chief minister Sheila Dikshit, became the 7th chief minister of Delhi. However, on 14 February 2014 (after 49 days of rule), Arvind Kejriwal resigned from his post citing the reason as his government's inability to table the Jan Lokpal Bill in Delhi Assembly for discussion, due to stiff opposition from other political parties in the house.

Delhi remained thereafter under President's Rule for about a year. On 4 November 2014, the Lieutenant Governor of Delhi Najeeb Jung made a recommendation to the Union Cabinet to dissolve the Delhi Legislative Assembly and conduct fresh elections. On 12 January 2015, the Election Commission of India announced that state assembly elections would be held on 7 February 2015 with results being announced on 10 February 2015.

Schedule and electorate 
The election commission announced the schedule for the elections on 12 January 2015. Voter-verified paper audit trail (VVPAT) along with EVMs were used in 2 assembly seats in Delhi elections- New Delhi and Delhi Cantt.

Voter statistics

Campaign
Safety of women, corruption, water problems and price rises were the main issues in the election.

Aam Aadmi Party
AAP started campaigning in Delhi in November 2014 and inducted several first-time candidates, with as many as 27 out of 70 MLA candidates. AAP convener Arvind Kejriwal was the chief ministerial candidate and contesting the elections from the New Delhi seat again after successfully managing to defeat incumbent MLA and then CM Sheila Dixit in the 2013 elections. Other known names and prominent faces in their candidate list are Jarnail Singh, Surinder Singh (commando), former Transport Minister for Delhi Saurabh Bhardwaj, former Education Minister Manish Sisodia, and former Law Minister Somnath Bharti.

The rallies and roadshows of Arvind Kejriwal were a great success, drawing large enthusiastic crowds. His nomination rally-cum-roadshow drew massive crowd and included flash mobs, slogans and chant of "5 Saal Kejriwal" song. AAP has consistently targeted the issues of corruption, security, education, environmental pollution, employment opportunities for youth and making Delhi a world class city.

Kejriwal's statement "Paise lekar sting kar lo" created controversies by asking volunteers to take bribes from other parties and do a sting. Kejriwal claimed that BJP had been trying to bribe AAP volunteers. The situation rose The Election Commission of India, which issued notice to Kejriwal to desist from breaking the laws governing the model code of conduct for elections in India. The Delhi court finally allowed Kejriwal to put forth his plea on the matter.

BJP targeted AAP and Kejriwal in a series of controversial negative newspaper ads. AAP claimed that one of these ads made a derogatory reference to Kejriwal's caste, while another one with a garlanded portrait of Anna Hazare signified Hazare's death. AAP threatened to complain about these ads to the Election Commission of India.

Noted music composer and party sympathizer Vishal Dadlani composed a song "Panch Saal Kejriwal" (5 years of Kejriwal Government) in December 2014 to give a boost to AAP's campaign. The song was seen used in flash mobs, roadshows, and rallies and was well received. AAP's campaign included advertisements on bus stops, billboards, and in the Delhi Metro, mostly focusing on Blue and Yellow Lines. To save costs ads were put up only on one side of the Metro.

The last days of the campaign saw TV actors Ayub Khan and Smita Bansal joining AAP. The AAP strategy for campaigning included flash mobs, street plays (nukkad natak), human banners, posters and pamphlets in auto-rickshaws.

Trinamool Congress chief Mamata Banerjee tweeted on 5 February "My request to all of you in Delhi to please vote for AAP. For the greater need of the country and development in Delhi". TMC has stringently criticized BJP's central government in the recent past. Also, CPI(M) general secretary Prakash Karat said in an interview, "15 seats are being contested jointly by Left parties in the Delhi polls. Rest of the 55 seats, our party has decided that it will ask our party members and voters to vote for the AAP. Most of the other left parties are also of the same view".

Bharatiya Janata Party
On 10 January 2015, Prime Minister Narendra Modi started the BJP's campaign for the Delhi assembly polls by holding an Abhinandan rally at the Ramlila Maidan. With some recent corruption allegations on BJP-Delhi unit head Satish Upadhyay, and speculation of increasing internal fights for CM position between several big leaders liker Jagdeesh Mukhi, Vijay Goel, and Satish Upadhyay, on 15 January 2015, BJP added Kiran Bedi as a prominent face to lead Delhi Campaign. Within 4 days, on 19 January, India's first woman IPS officer, anti-corruption activist and Magsaysay awardee Kiran Bedi was announced by the BJP as their candidate for chief minister in Delhi.

Analysts questioned BJP's decision to project Kiran Bedi as the party's CM candidate when two opinion polls indicated that AAP had gained ground over BJP after the announcement of her candidature. Kiran Bedi was seen leaving news interviews and even questions of her being the first woman IPS and her role in towing Indra Gandhi's convoy car were raised. Her induction led to internal rifts in the party, but the party president Amit Shah defended the decision. On 2 February, Kiran Bedi's manager announced his resignation blaming her "dictatorial attitude", but then withdrew the resignation and apologized on the same day.

Key party strategist Arun Jaitley (now the cabinet minister) was tasked with bringing together the BJP's campaign efforts, with regular meetings at the Delhi BJP office, and Prime Minister Narendra Modi addressing four rallies. Also, 11 central ministers and 17 lawmakers of the party were deployed in the campaign for Delhi. Human Resource Minister Smriti Irani and External Affairs Minister Sushma Swaraj hit the campaign trail addressing several rallies in South and North West Delhi. Haryana Chief Minister Manohar Lal Khattar, held a public meeting in the Bijwasan area of South West Delhi. Madhya Pradesh Chief Minister Shivraj Singh Chouhan is scheduled to campaign for BJP
Finance Minister Arun Jaitley, Commerce Minister Nirmala Sitharaman and Chemicals and Fertiliser Minister Ananth Kumar have been making rounds of Delhi BJP office for the last couple of days. As of 29 January, Bharatiya Janata Party (BJP) has brought in 22 of its top ministers at the Centre and 17 MPs to take charge of the campaign. According to another source " around 58 Union ministers and MPs took charge of Delhi constituencies. More than 70 MPs have been assigned to oversee preparations for the Feb. 7 polls to the 70-member Assembly," said a senior BJP leader. Shazia Ilmi a member of AAP who has joined BJP saying BJP stands for good governance and development.

BJP actively used the media for their campaign, and released a series of newspaper advertisements targeting AAP's CM candidate Arvind Kejriwal.

During the last phases of the campaign rallies of Prime Minister Narendra Modi got poor turnouts and the BJP Delhi state unit was seen complaining about appointing Kiran Bedi as the CM candidate.

BJP had prepoll alliance with Shiromani Akali Dal, whose candidates contested four seats: three on BJP's symbol and one on SAD's own symbol.

Indian National Congress
On 13 January 2015, Ajay Maken was announced as the head of the Congress campaign committee. Maken is also the party's chief minister candidate. On 19 January, Maken released a booklet titled 49 dino ki ultee chaal, Dilli hui behal listing Kejriwal's U-turns and misgovernance during his 49-day government.

Other parties
Other parties such as Bahujan Samaj Party, Poorvanchal Rashtriya Congress, and Janata Dal are also part of the campaign but none have enough candidates to get a majority vote to form the government on their own.

Manifestos

Aam Aadmi Party
AAP released its manifesto on 31 January 2015. Highlights of 70-point manifesto

  Resolved to legislate the Delhi Jan Lokpal Bill after coming to power.
  Legislate the Swaraj Act to devolve power directly to the people
  Acting within the constitutional framework will use its moral and political authority to push for full statehood for Delhi
  Will keep its promise of reducing electricity bills by half.
  Conduct a comprehensive performance audit of discoms by the Comptroller and Auditor General of India.
  Put Delhi's own power station at the pithead and comprehensively solve Delhi's electricity problem in long run.
  reiterates the 2013 Delhi manifesto promise of providing consumers the right to choose between electricity providers.
  Facilitate a phased shift to renewable and alternate sources of energy like Solar Energy.
  Provide Water as a Right. It will provide access to clean drinking water to all of Delhi at an affordable price
  Ensure free lifeline water of up to 20 kiloliters (20,000 liters) to every household per month.
  Provide universal access to potable water to all its citizens of Delhi at a sustainable and affordable price.
  Ensure firm implementation of the HC order that entitles Delhi to extra raw water from Haryana in the Munak canal
  Preserve and replenish local and decentralized water resources to augment Delhi's water resources.
  Committed to clamping down on Delhi's powerful water mafia working under the patronage of political leaders.
  Several steps will be taken to revive the Yamuna including sewer treatment and control affluent discharge.
  Formulate a clear policy and standards for the ownership and operation of e-rickshaws,

Bharatiya Janata Party
On 29 January 2015, the party announced that they would release a vision document before the elections, as full statehood for Delhi was a topic of debate in the party. Although such is the case, beginning 28 January 2015, the BJP's chief ministerial candidate Kiran Bedi has initiated a series of tweets with hashtag #KiransBlueprint detailing her plans for improving Delhi. It has been said that no manifesto by BJP has provided AAP with a "much needed ammunition" in their Election Campaign

On 3 February 2015, the BJP's vision document was released publicly.  It included 270 points and 35 areas of focus, which included the following:
 100% transparency
 Unimpeachable integrity
 Police accountability
 Maximum measurability
 Fiscal prudence
 Zero tolerance to Corruption
 Focus on youth affairs
 Electricity & Water, Cleanliness
 Education & Skill Development
 Environment

Indian National Congress

Synopsis of Manifesto
 Vows to lower electricity charges in the national capital.
 Rs. 1.5/unit rate for 0–200 unit users.
 50 percent rebate for above 200 unit users.
 Promises to provide free wi-fi facility across Delhi.
 A uniform pension scheme of Rs. 2000 will be started.
 Assure rate cut in power tariffs
 Waive off old water supply bills.
 Government internet cafes in all assembly seats
 Committed to Yamuna cleaning
 Free sewer connection to the people
 Public transports would also have free wi-fi.
 All hospitals would be equipped with modern diagnosis facilities.
 Service assurance for all government employees. Regularization policies for government teachers and other government servants would follow.
 Metro extension is certainly our commitment
 Salary hike for Anganwadi workers is also on agenda.
 Women's safety is our concern. civil defense and home guard recruitment will be increased
 In addition to this, women's toilets are on our agenda.
 CCTV to be installed in public transport is another focus of the party.

Contestants

Nominations
The Election Commission canceled the nomination of 230 candidates during the scrutiny of papers and 693 candidates were deemed valid to contest the polls.

List of contestants of major parties
Bold signifies the winner

Results by districts

Results by constituency

Reactions 
 Prime Minister of India Narendra Modi called up Arvind Kejriwal and congratulated him on his thumping victory in Delhi and assured him of all support from the Centre for development of the national capital.
 West Bengal's Chief Minister Mamata Banerjee expressed her "heartiest congratulations" to the party. She also said, "This is a victory for the people and a big defeat for the arrogant and those who are doing political vendetta & spreading hate among people."
  CPI(M) General Secretary Prakash Karat said "The stupendous victory of AAP in the Delhi election is a total rejection of BJP and the leadership of Narendra Modi”.
 Andhra Pradesh Chief Minister Nara Chandrababu Naidu said in a statement that "The victory of AAP reflects the greatness of democracy in India".
 Telangana Chief Minister K Chandrasekhar Rao said "The Delhi (Assembly election) results are an example to show that the people are thinking differently from traditional politics".
 Janata Dal (United) leader Nitish Kumar told the media "People want development with justice. They never accept arrogance. This is reflected in AAP's victory in Delhi".
 Singer Vishal Dadlani tweeted that he was "Wavin' the Jhaadu!".
 BJP's Chief Ministerial candidate Kiran Bedi congratulated Kejriwal and also asked him "make it a world class city".
 Gul Panag, actor-turned-politician and a candidate for General elections 2014 from Chandigarh from Aam Aadmi Party, said that the citizens of Delhi are creditable for the win and exclaimed that she wants to expand the party in Chandigarh. She also turned out for campaigning for Aam Aadmi Party for the elections.
Shiv Sena President Uddhav Thackeray mocked BJP by stating "Voters in Delhi have shown that a tsunami is bigger than any wave ."
Rajdeep Sardesai A famous Indian Journalist referring to AAP's use of Social Media and indifference of mainstream media to AAP before the election said "In the 2015 Delhi elections, Arvind Kejriwal didn't just demolish his opposition; he also defeated the media. The AAP leader had gone over our heads, effectively used social media, but most importantly, go directly to those who really mattered: the voter! Pompous editors, noisy anchors, and a corporatized media ownership had all been defeated."

Aftermath
Second Kejriwal ministry of the Delhi government was formed on 14 February 2015, led by Kejriwal as Delhi's chief minister for a second time at Ramlila Maidan.

See also
 First Legislative Assembly of Delhi
 Second Legislative Assembly of Delhi
 Third Legislative Assembly of Delhi
 Fourth Legislative Assembly of Delhi
 Fifth Legislative Assembly of Delhi
 Sixth Legislative Assembly of Delhi

References

External links
 Official Website of the Chief Electoral Officer of Delhi
 BJP Vision Document
 Congress Manifesto
 AAP Manifesto
 Delhi Election News 

Delhi
2015
2010s in Delhi